The 109th Field Artillery Regiment is an artillery regiment of the United States Army and the Pennsylvania Army National Guard.

The unit was organized on October 17, 1775 and is one of several National Guard units with colonial roots. The first unit commander was Colonel Zebulon Butler. The unit traces is origins to the Connecticut Militia under the 24th Regiment since the Wyoming Valley was a part of Connecticut at the time. After alternating between an infantry and artillery unit throughout the early years and campaigns, the battalion was designated as the 109th Field Artillery Regiment on October 11, 1917. The regiment served in combat during World War I and was commanded by Colonel Asher Miner.

During the 1950s and 1960s, under the Pentomic army structure, the 2nd Battalion, 109th Artillery, served with the 28th Division.

1st Battalion
1st Battalion, 109th FA, (the "Wyoming Valley Guards") is a battalion of the United States Army, maintained by the Pennsylvania Army National Guard. It is a subordinate formation of the 169th Field Artillery Brigade. Its headquarters is at the historic Kingston Armory located in Kingston, PA. The unit was organized on October 17, 1775 and is one of the oldest military units in the United States Army.

In 1984-85 the 1st Battalion was part of the divisional artillery of the 28th Infantry Division.

Recent news articles in 2014 and 2015 stated the 55th BCT is under consideration for inactivation by late 2016 and as a result may inactivate the battalion.

The task organization has changed multiple times throughout the decades as the force structure of the Army and National Guard changes. As of 2015, the task organization consists of Headquarters, Headquarters Battery, Alpha Battery, Bravo Battery, Charlie Battery, and 2803 Forward Support Company.

Campaign Participation Credit

Revolutionary War 
 Brandywine 
 Germantown
 New Jersey 1777
 Pennsylvania 1777
 Pennsylvania 1778
 Pennsylvania 1779

Mexican War 
 Vera Cruz
 Cerro Gordo

Civil War 
 Chancellorsville
 Gettysburg
 Wilderness
 Spotsylvania
 Cold Harbor
 Petersburg
 Virginia 1861
 Virginia 1863

World War I 
 Oise-Aisne
 Ypres-Lys
 Meuse-Argonne
 Champagne 1918
 Lorraine 1918

World War II 
 Normandy
 Northern France
 Rhineland
 Ardennes-Alsace
 Central Europe

War on Terrorism 
 To Be Determined

Decorations 
 Presidential Unit Citation (Army), Streamer embroidered ARDENNE
 Luxembourg Croix de Guerre, Streamer embroidered LUXEMBOURG

Heraldry

Coat of Arms

Distinctive Unit Insignia

References

Field artillery regiments of the United States Army
Field artillery regiments of the United States Army National Guard
F 109
Military in Pennsylvania